Intertwined is an Argentine comedy-drama streaming television series for children and adolescents, which is produced by Pampa Films and Gloriamundi Producciones for The Walt Disney Company. The series premiered in Latin America, the UK, the US and other select countries on November 12, 2021 on Disney+.

On May 2, 2022, the series has been renewed for a second season, which will be released on 2023. By June 2022, the series was additionally renewed for a third season.

Plot  
16-year-old Allegra has a great passion for musical comedies and dreams of becoming part of the musical theater group Eleven O'Clock as the leading actress in Freaky Friday. With the same play that made her grandmother Cocó, a living legend of musical theater, famous many years ago. Allegra looks up to her grandmother and wants to be a talented actress one day. But the events of the past that shaped the complicated and troubled relationship between her grandmother Coco and Allegra's mother, Caterina, have had a profound impact on Allegra's life. However, this changes dramatically when Allegra finds a mysterious bracelet in her room, which brings her to 1994. In the year in which Caterina, the same age as Allegra in the present, was just starting her own career with Eleven O'Clock. A career in the shadow of her mother Cocó, who was already a star then and at the height of her career. Allegra uses her time in the past to learn more about her family's history. Allegra will try to heal the wounds and bring her family back together. But will Allegra manage to change the past to make her dream come true?

Cast

Main

Recurring

Episodes

Reception 
Joel Keller of Decider found Intertwined to be an entertaining drama comedy through its plot, found agreeable that the series focuses more on Carolina Domenech's character and the challenges she faces than the nostalgic atmosphere provided by the 90's, and stated that the characters manage to keep interest in the story of the series. Ashley Moulton of Common Sense Media rated the series 4 out of 5 stars, praised the depiction of positive messages, such as gratitude, and complimented the presence of role models, stating Domenech's character demonstrates perseverance and manages to be responsible, while calling the series fun.

References

External links 
 
 

Argentine comedy-drama television series
Television shows set in Argentina
Spanish-language television shows
Disney+ original programming
Television series about teenagers
Television series by Disney